Gangavalli is a panchayat town in Salem district  in the state of Tamil Nadu, India.

History
Gangavalli is probably named after the holy name "ganga" (river swetha) and the flowering plant "valli", which spread over the river flowing across Gangavalli. In the past 18th and 19th centuries it was ruled by Zamindars, the last of whom was reportedly "Chidambara Mudaliyar" who ruled Gangavalli from 1890 until 1920.

Demographics
 India census, Gangavalli had a population of 12,015. Males 5,907 and females 6,108. Gangavalli has an average literacy rate of 60%, higher than the national average of 59.5%: male literacy is 68%, and female literacy is 51%. In Gangavalli, 11% of the population is under 6 years of age.

Business 
Agriculture is main business. Other businesses include automobile, textiles, and milk products.

Agriculture 
Sugarcane, paddy, turmeric, maize and cotton are the main crops cultivated in Gangavalli. It is also noted for tapioca (cassava roots), and there are several tapioca-based industries near Attur which manufacture products such as "javvarisi" (sago) for markets all over India.

Assembly Constituency

The city is part of the Gangavalli (state assembly constituency). A. Nallathambi is the MLA from ADMK party elected in 2021.

Geography 
It has an average elevation of 292 metres (958 feet).

References

Cities and towns in Salem district